James Dugald McNiven (March 11, 1859 – July 17, 1936) was a Canadian politician. He served in the Legislative Assembly of British Columbia from 1903 to 1907  from the electoral district of Victoria City, as a Liberal.

References

British Columbia Liberal Party MLAs
1859 births
1936 deaths